Cerro Galán is a caldera in the Catamarca Province of Argentina. It is one of the largest exposed calderas in the world and forms part of the Central Volcanic Zone of the Andes, one of the three volcanic belts found in South America. One of several major caldera systems in the Central Volcanic Zone, the mountain is grouped into the Altiplano–Puna volcanic complex.

Volcanic activity at Galán is the indirect consequence of the subduction of the Nazca Plate beneath the South America Plate, and involves the infiltration of melts into the crust and the formation of secondary magmas which after storage in the crust give rise to the dacitic to rhyodacitic rocks erupted by the volcano.

Galán was active between 5.6 and 4.51 million years ago, when it generated a number of ignimbrites known as the Toconquis group which crop out mainly west of the caldera. The largest eruption of Galán was 2.08 ± 0.02 million years ago and was the source of the Galán ignimbrite, which covered the surroundings of the caldera with volcanic material.

Geography and geomorphology 
The Galán caldera lies in the northwestern Catamarca Province of Argentina and was discovered in 1975 in a remote region of the Andes, using satellite images. The town of Antofagasta de la Sierra lies west-southwest of the Galán caldera, Tacuil is almost due northeast from the caldera and El Penon southwest of the volcano.

Galán is part of the Central Volcanic Zone of the Andes, which lies on the western margin of South America, where the Nazca Plate subducts beneath the South America Plate. There are about 50 volcanoes with recent activity in the Central Volcanic Zone, and additional volcanoes exist in the Northern Volcanic Zone and the Southern Volcanic Zone, two other volcanic belts north and south.

The volcanic arc runs along the borders between Bolivia and Argentina with Chile, and behind the volcanic arc lies a chain of silicic volcanoes, of which Galán is a southern member. This volcanism appears to be a surface expression of a pluton, and at depths of  beneath the Altiplano-Puna volcanic complex electrical, gravity and seismic tomography data have localized a structure of partially molten rock called the "Altiplano Puna Magma Body". Volcanism in this "back" region may not be directly related to subduction processes despite the region itself being close to a subducting margin.

The Galán caldera lies on the eastern margin of the Andes, where the Sierras Pampeanas begin. The region is characterized by the Puna, a high plateau similar to Tibet in Asia.

Local 

Such dimensions make Galán one of the biggest calderas on Earth. Only the western margin of the caldera structure appears to be a true caldera margin, however, with different landforms forming the rest of the caldera walls and the actual collapse caldera covering only a portion of the topographic caldera expression; the latter has been defined to be a volcano-tectonic depression.

The caldera contains a resurgent dome, whose highest point in the frost-shattered Galán massif reaches an elevation of about -.

Summits along the caldera margin include Cerro Aguas Calientes to the north, Cerro Leon Muerto to the southeast, Cerro Pabellon to the southwest and Cerro Toconquis to the northwest. Younger volcanoes have developed on the western and northern rim of the Galán caldera.

Hydrology

The caldera contains a lake in its southwestern corner, which is known as Laguna Diamante. Laguna Diamante has gained attention among scientists for the extreme environmental conditions that life within the lake has to withstand, including high arsenic contents of the waters and high insolation with ultraviolet radiation. The water is hyper-alkaline and five times as salty as the sea but supports microorganisms which form microbial mats and provide food for a colony of flamingos. Tube-shaped microbialites have also been reported. A smaller lake known as Laguna Pabellon lies just south of Laguna Diamante. North of the resurgent dome, the Rio Aguas Calientes drains the caldera northward, while east of it the Rio Leon Muerto runs eastward out of the caldera. 

Rivers in the caldera and neighbourhood display river terraces which may reflect pre-caldera formation uplift of the terrain and uplift associated with the resurgent dome. These drainages eventually converge in the Rio de Los Patos and end into the Salar del Hombre Muerto north of Galán. The western flanks of the caldera drain into the Antofagasta de la Sierra valley through a number of drainages such as Rio Punilla, Rio Toconquis, Rio Miriguaca, Rio Las Pitas; the waters eventually end into the Laguna Antofagasta south of Antofagasta de la Sierra. The first one is known as the Aguas Calientes hydrothermal spring and features deposits of tufa and boiling water. Another geothermal system is known as La Colcha and includes fumaroles as well as boiling water and sinter deposits; it has been prospected for the possibility of geothermal power generation.

Geology 
The basement beneath the caldera consists of 600–365 million years old metamorphic and sedimentary rocks of Precambrian to Paleozoic age. These include intrusions of granitoid character and are overlain with Paleozoic marine sediments.

About 14.5 million years ago volcanic activity started in the region, first west of Galán but by 7 million years ago it shifted to the future caldera, forming the Cerro Colorado, Pabellon and Cerro Toconquis composite volcanoes on its future western rim. The more westerly centres are today represented by eroded volcanoes. Since about 6.6 million years ago the volcanic activity produced rocks of both mafic and silicic compositions. The increase of volcanic activity has been attributed to the steepening of the Nazca Plate slab which allowed mantle material to penetrate into the space between the lower crust and the slab. North of 21° degrees southern latitude ignimbritic volcanism started earlier, generating the Altos de Pica and Oxaya formations.

Mafic volcanism occurred south and west of Galán both before its large eruption and afterwards, in the valley of Antofagasta de la Sierra and may have continued to less than ten thousand years ago. The positions of the exact vents are controlled by recent fault systems in the region.

Since about 10 million years ago, the area has been subject to reverse faulting which has disrupted the basement along north–south lines, forming a rift valley that also stretches from north to south. The magma erupted by the Galán system was likewise channelled along such fault systems, and neighbouring volcanoes were similarly influenced by them; the fault systems at Galán proper are known as the Diablillos-Galán faults. Another major lineament in the area is the Archibarca lineament, which is formed by a strike-slip fault that extends from the northwest to the southeast in the region and which intersects the Diablillos-Galán faults at the location of the caldera.

Composition 
Galán has erupted mainly potassium-rich dacitic to rhyolitic rocks that are often called rhyodacitic, and which reflect a calc-alkaline suite. Each ignimbrite has usually a uniform composition but there is some variation between individual ignimbrites; for example older rocks contain amphibole and younger rocks instead sanidine. Minerals contained in the eruption products include allanite, apatite, biotite, hornblende, ilmenite, magnetite, orthopyroxene, plagioclase, quartz, sanidine and zircon. Hydrothermal alteration has left calcite in some rocks. Trace element patterns are distinct in the Galán ignimbrite in comparison to the Toconquis Group rocks.

The formation of the Galán magma has been explained with melting of lower crustal rocks under the influence of rising basaltic magmas that supplied the heat needed for the melting processes, and which also directly contributed to magma formation through mixing events. Further metasomatism in the crust and fractional crystallization processes completed the magma genesis process. After eruption, a leftover pluton would have been generated inside the crust.

Based on the presence of two separate populations of pumice in the Galán ignimbrite it has been inferred that there were two types of magma in the magmatic system during the Galán eruption, a larger volume of so-called "white" magma and a "grey" magma which was injected into the "white" magma pool and eventually rose above the latter. More generally, it appears that before each eruption there were two batches of magma present beneath the volcano which however were very similar owing perhaps to a homogenization process that took place deep in the crust. Before the eruption, the magma is estimated to have been  hot.

Climate and biology 
Precipitation occurs mostly during the summer months.

Between  elevation, vegetation consists of high altitude steppe dominated by Poaceae (grasses) such as Festuca (fescue) and Stipa (feather grass). At lower altitudes, wetlands have their own vegetation. In sheltered areas birds like ducks and flamingos can be observed.

Eruptive history 
Volcanic activity at Galán occurred in two separate stages, which are separated by an erosional unconformity during which the ignimbrite apron of the Toconquis group was incised by deep valleys. Mechanistically, the onset of the eruptions has been explained with delamination events during which parts of the lower crust broke off, asthenospheric material replaced the crust lost by delamination and basaltic magmas penetrated the remaining crust.

These stages have left an ignimbrite plateau that surrounds the caldera except on its southern side, and which is noticeable on satellite images.

Toconquis Group 
The first stage occurred between 5.60 and 4.51 million years ago and consisted of the eruption of large ignimbrites such as the Blanco, Cueva Negra, several Merihuaca ignimbrites and Real Grande ignimbrite as well as lava domes, all from north–south trending fractures, forming the Toconquis Group (formerly called the Toconquis Formation). The Real Grande and Cueva Negra ignimbrites were considered to be homologous, as are the easterly Leon Muerto and several Merihuaca ignimbrites, but it was later found that the Leon Muerto and Merihuaca ignimbrites probably were erupted from distinct vent systems and have distinct compositions, and the Cueva Negra ignimbrite was later considered to be a separate formation from the other Toconquis group ignimbrites. The later classifications established a 6.5  5.5 million-year-old Blanco/Merihuaca ignimbrites, 4.8 million-year-old Pitas, 4.7 million-year-old Real Grande, 4.5 million-year-old Vega and 3.8 million-year-old Cueva Negra ignimbrite.

The formation is fairly heterogeneous, with some ignimbrites separated by sharp contacts and the degree of welding and crystal content of pumices varies from one ignimbrite to the other. Generally the ignimbrites are rich in crystals and pumice, are unwelded and contain few flow structures, with the exception of the welded Cueva Negra ignimbrite. Some ignimbrite eruptions were preceded by the formation of Plinian eruption columns that generated ash fallout, and there is evidence for pulsating flow in the ignimbrites.

The last eruption may have generated a caldera that was later obliterated. Emission of lava flows occurred during the Toconquis phase as well, in general there was vigorous volcanic activity between the eruptions that formed the main ignimbrites. The Cueva Negra ignimbrite was emplaced after the Toconquis Group, and small lava domes and pyroclastic flows continued to be erupted until the Galán ignimbrite proper. The magmatic system shallowed during this time, resulting in composition changes of the erupted ignimbrites and a general increase of elevations in the region.

Galán ignimbrite 
2.08 ± 0.02 million years ago the rhyodacitic Galán ignimbrite proper was emplaced. A contrary view is that the Galán ignimbrite was largely eroded only on its northern side by wind action, forming yardangs. The resurgent dome consists of Galán ignimbrite material, along with basement rocks. The "Toba Dacitica"  outcrop away from the volcano was once considered part of the Galán eruption but later compositional differences were found.

The Galán ignimbrite is fairly homogeneous and has a high crystal content; overall it appears that the eruption commenced and reached large dimensions fairly quickly without leaving time for an eruption column or distinct flow units to form, except in some places. Conversely, the produced flows were relatively slow flows that had little capacity to pass above topographic obstacles or to move rocks around. It nevertheless spread over large distances, since the topography of the region had been flattened by the previous Toconquis ignimbrites, and was still hot by the time it came to a standstill. Pumice is scarce and usually present in only small fragments, and lithic fragments are also uncommon except at the bases of the deposit. Fiamme structures on the other hand are fairly common especially where the ignimbrite crossed river valleys. The ignimbrite displays varying degrees of welding but has often spectacular columnar joints.

The Galán ignimbrite is the largest ignimbrite erupted by this centre; there is a tendency of the volume of individual ignimbrites to increase as the volcanoes grow younger, not only at Galán but also at other Puna ignimbrite centres, and this may be a consequence of progressive changes in the crust. Such giant eruptions have not been observed during historical time and are considered to be among the most dangerous volcanic phenomena known.

Kay et al. proposed that the Galán ignimbrite consisted of three separate units, an intracaldera one emplaced 2.13 million years ago and two extracaldera ones 2.09 and 2.06 million years ago.

Post-Galán volcanism 
The main Galán caldera formed during the Galán ignimbrite eruption, and it is possible that the collapse of the magma chamber roof actually started the eruption. Later it was found that a trapdoor collapse is a more plausible interpretation of the caldera structure and that the caldera appears to be much smaller than its present-day topographic expression. Most likely a lake formed within the caldera after its eruption.

Later volcanic activity resulted in lava flows of dacitic composition being erupted along the ring fault of the caldera, as well as the formation of the resurgent dome by about  uplift along the eastern caldera margin fault. This uplift encompasses both Galán ignimbrite rocks but also parts of the basement, the latter especially in the southern part of the dome. Post-caldera volcanism occurred on the northern margin of the caldera 2.01 ± 0.28 million years ago, and several small ignimbrites were emplaced after the main Galán eruption until less than 2 million years ago. These ignimbrites have similar compositions to the Galán ignimbrite and were formed from magma left over by the main Galán eruption. The onset of resurgence within the caldera may have been triggered by the same magma that is responsible for the post-caldera volcanism along the eastern caldera rims. The post-caldera volcanic systems appear to be rather ill-defined, however. The most recent activity was of tectonic nature and consists of movements along the faults and mafic volcanism farther west. Seismic tomography indicates that there is still a melt zone under Galán, the "Cerro Galán Mush Body".

See also 

 Cerro Beltrán
 List of volcanoes in Argentina

Notes

References

Bibliography

Further reading 
 Cerro Galan Caldera  Oregon State University
 Cerro Galan Caldera, Argentina, from How Volcanoes Work, by Vic Camp, Department of Geological Sciences, San Diego State University
 
 

Mountains of Argentina
Volcanoes of Argentina
Volcanoes of Catamarca Province
Andean Volcanic Belt
Calderas of Argentina
VEI-8 volcanoes
Supervolcanoes
Volcanic crater lakes
Polygenetic volcanoes
Pliocene calderas
Pleistocene calderas
Pleistocene Argentina
Puna de Atacama